The 2022–23 season is Gokulam Kerala's Sixth season since its establishment in 2017 and their fifth season in the I-League. In addition to the I-League, Gokulam Kerala will also participate in the Super Cup, IFA Shield, and continental tournament AFC Cup.

First-team squad

New contracts

Transfers & loans

Transfers in

Loan in

Transfers out

Current technical staff

Pre-season

Baji Rout Cup

Quarter finals

Competitions

Overview

I-League

League table

Results by round

Matches 
Note: I-League announced the fixtures for the 2022–23 season on 1 November 2022.

Super Cup

After finishing 3rd in the I-League, Malabarians will have to play a qualifier against 8th-ranked Mohammedan to earn a place in the group stage.

Qualifiers

AFC Cup

play–offs for AFC Cup
Since the 2023–24 AFC Champions League and the 2023–24 AFC Cup adopted transitional calendar with the switch from Spring-to-Autumn to an Autumn-to-Spring schedule, the All India Football Federation decided that its continental slots are determined by extra playoffs.

Squad statistics

Appearances
Players with no appearances are not included on the list.

As of match played 12 March 2023

Goal Scorers

Assists
Not all goals have an assist.

Clean sheets

Disciplinary record

Club awards

Player of the Month award

References

2022–23 I-League by team
Gokulam Kerala FC seasons
2022–23 in Indian football